Agelasta cameroni is a species of beetle in the family Cerambycidae. It was described by Stephan von Breuning in 1978. It is known from Malaysia.

References

cameroni
Beetles described in 1978